Dabas may refer to:
 Dabas, Hungary, a town in Pest county, Hungary
 Dabas–Gyón FC, an association football club
 FC Dabas, an association football club
 Dabas (clan), a Jat gotra of India
 Dabas (surname), a surname of India (including a list of persons with the name)
 Richard Dabas, a Dominican footballer

See also 
 Hamed Abu Daabas, Israeli Bedouin leader
 Dabbas (disambiguation)
 Daba (disambiguation)
 Daba Mountains, a mountain range in Central China